Rayane Boukemia (born 11 October 1992) is a French footballer who currently plays for USM Annaba in the Algerian Ligue Professionnelle 2.

Career
After nine years in France with SC Schiltigheim and having graduated from the University of Strasbourg in 2015, Boukemia moved to the United States to attend Southern New Hampshire University.

While playing at SNHU, Boukemia played with Premier Development League side Reading United AC in 2016.

Boukemia signed with United Soccer League side Rochester Rhinos on 16 February 2017.

References

External links

1992 births
Living people
French footballers
French expatriate footballers
SC Schiltigheim players
Southern New Hampshire Penmen men's soccer players
Reading United A.C. players
Rochester New York FC players
Association football forwards
Expatriate soccer players in the United States
USL League Two players
USL Championship players
French sportspeople of Algerian descent
Bahlinger SC players